Del Stanley "Pake" McEntire (born June 23, 1953) is an American country music artist. He is elder brother to Reba McEntire and Susie Luchsinger.

He was born in Chockie, Oklahoma, United States, and signed to RCA Nashville in 1986, Pake made his debut on the national country music scene with the release of his first single, "Every Night", which peaked at No. 20 on the Billboard Hot Country Singles chart. It was followed by his biggest chart hit, "Savin' My Love for You" at No. 3. "Bad Love" and "Heart vs. Heart", also from his first album, were both minor hits as well.

McEntire's second album for RCA, titled My Whole World, was released in 1988. It produced two more minor chart entries before he was dropped from RCA's roster. Since then, he has issued three more albums on independent labels.

Discography

Albums

Singles

References

1953 births
American country singer-songwriters
Living people
People from Atoka County, Oklahoma
Singer-songwriters from Oklahoma
RCA Records Nashville artists
American country fiddlers
Country musicians from Oklahoma